Guillaume Larrivé (born 24 January 1977) is a French politician who served as the member of the National Assembly for Yonne's 1st constituency from 2012 to 2022.

Education
A native of Mulhouse, Larrivé studied at Sciences Po, ESSEC Business School and École nationale d'administration.

Career
Larrivé began his career as a member of the Council of State in 2002. He served in government as a law adviser to the Interior Minister Nicolas Sarkozy (2005–2007), deputy head of cabinet to the Immigration Minister (2007–2009), Labour Minister (2009) and Interior Minister (2009–2011) Brice Hortefeux and Counsellor to the President, Nicolas Sarkozy (2011–2012).

Larrivé also served as a member of the Regional Council of Burgundy from 2010 to 2012. After Sarkozy's defeat in the presidential election of 2012, Larrivé was elected to the National Assembly. He was re-elected in 2017. He was a candidate in the 2019 Republican leadership election.

He lost his seat in the first round of the 2022 French legislative election.

Political positions
Ahead of the 2022 presidential elections, Larrivé publicly declared his support for Valérie Pécresse as the Republicans’ candidate.

References

1977 births
Living people
Politicians from Mulhouse
ESSEC Business School alumni
Sciences Po alumni
École nationale d'administration alumni
Members of the Conseil d'État (France)
The Republicans (France) politicians
Deputies of the 14th National Assembly of the French Fifth Republic
Deputies of the 15th National Assembly of the French Fifth Republic